Classix Shape is a limited edition Picture disc released by British folk metal group Skyclad. Due to a printing error, the actual track-listing differs from that on the sleeve.

Track listing
"Vintage Whine"
"Inequality Street"
"Constance Eternal"
"Building a Ruin"
"Sins of Emission" (Unplugged version)

1999 EPs
Skyclad (band) albums